The Congressman is a 2016 American political drama film directed by Robert Mrazek and Jared Martin.

Maine Congressman Charlie Winship has had a bad day. After being caught on video failing to stand and recite the pledge of allegiance, he knocks out another House member, confronts his angry ex-wife, and faces denunciation by the media for attacking one of the most cherished patriotic symbols in America. As his life spirals out of control, Charlie embarks on a journey to a remote island in the Atlantic whose eccentric inhabitants are in the middle of a shooting war over their fishing grounds. Treat Williams stars as The Congressman in this humorous and moving film that raises the important question of what it means to be an American.

Cast
Treat Williams ... Charlie Winship
Elizabeth Marvel ... Rae Blanchard
Ryan Merriman ... Jared Barnes
Chris Conroy ... Ben
George Hamilton ... Laird Devereaux
Marshall Bell ... Sherm Hawkins
Fritz Weaver ... Harlan Lantier

References

External links

2010s political drama films
American political drama films
2016 directorial debut films
Films about politicians
Films set in Maine
2016 drama films
2010s English-language films
2010s American films